"Dead Man's Shoes" is episode 83 of the American television anthology series The Twilight Zone, and is the 18th episode of the third season. It was written by past series contributor Charles Beaumont, and was originally aired on January 19, 1962 on CBS.

Opening narration

Plot
A homeless man, Nate Bledsoe, snatches a pair of shoes from Dane, the target of a mob hit dumped in an alley. Two of his homeless associates try to con him out of the plainly expensive shoes, to no avail. Wearing the shoes infuses him with the personality and memories of the victim, and he continues his life as Dane.

Nate stops by the home of Dane's girlfriend, who recognizes his manner but remains confused by his appearance. Nate then goes to a bar to confront Dagget, the boss who had him killed. Dagget is at first unsettled, but then realizes who Nate is and has him gunned down. Before he dies, he promises, "I'll be back, Bernie, and I'll keep coming back… again, and again, and I'll get you." The body is dumped in the same place as the original victim. A homeless man finds the corpse, takes the shoes, puts them on and the cycle begins anew.

Closing narration

Cast
 Warren Stevens as Nate Bledsoe
 Richard Devon as Dagget
 Joan Marshall as Wilma
 Ben Wright as Chips
 Harry Swoger as Sam
 Ron Hagerthy as Ben
 Florence Marly as Dagget's girlfriend

Production 
The soundtrack uses recycled music from a previous episode, "The Fever".

Remakes 
The episode was remade in the 1985 revival as "Dead Woman's Shoes" and in the 2002 revival as "Dead Man's Eyes". This makes it the only original episode to be remade in two of the revival series.

References
DeVoe, Bill. (2008). Trivia from The Twilight Zone. Albany, GA: Bear Manor Media. 
Grams, Martin. (2008). The Twilight Zone: Unlocking the Door to a Television Classic. Churchville, MD: OTR Publishing.

External links

1962 American television episodes
The Twilight Zone (1959 TV series season 3) episodes
Television shows written by Charles Beaumont
Television episodes about spirit possession